Gizgayit Salman gizi Hasanova (1924 – August 22, 2012) was an Azerbaijani cotton grower, Hero of Socialist Labor.

Biography 
Gizgayit Hasanova was born in 1924 in Khyrmandaly village of Bilasuvar District. She began his career as an ordinary collective farmer. From 1953 to 1996 she worked as the chairman of the collective farm named after Telman in Khyrmandaly village.

Gizgayit Hasanova graduated from the K. Timiryazev Moscow Agricultural Academy in 1975. In 1984, the Telman collective farm was named after Gizgayit Hasanova.

Gizgayit Hasanova was elected a deputy of the Supreme Soviet of the USSR of the V-VI convocation, the Supreme Soviet of the Azerbaijan SSR 9 times, II-X convocations, a member of the Central Committee of the Azerbaijan Communist Party, the Presidium of the Supreme Soviet of the Azerbaijan SSR, a member of the Bilasuvar district committee.

Hasanova died in 2012.

Awards 
Hero of Socialist Labour — March 10, 1948
Order of Lenin — March 10, 1948; April 8, 1971; December 12, 1973; March 10, 1982
Order of the October Revolution — December 27, 1976
Order of the Red Banner of Labour — April 30, 1966
Order of Friendship of Peoples
Medal "For Labour Valour" — March 7, 1960
Jubilee Medal "In Commemoration of the 100th Anniversary of the Birth of Vladimir Ilyich Lenin"

References 

1924 births
2012 deaths
Azerbaijan Communist Party (1920) politicians
Heroes of Socialist Labour
Recipients of the Order of Lenin
Recipients of the Order of the Red Banner of Labour
Recipients of the Order of Friendship of Peoples
Sixth convocation members of the Supreme Soviet of the Soviet Union
Fifth convocation members of the Supreme Soviet of the Soviet Union